Tolkunov is a Russian masculine surname, its feminine counterpart is Tolkunova. It may refer to
Dmytro Tolkunov (born 1979), Ukrainian Olympic ice hockey player
Irina Tolkunova (born 1971), Russian/Kazakhstani water polo player
Valentina Tolkunova (1946–2010), Russian singer 

Russian-language surnames